Matt Gray may refer to:

Matt Gray (footballer, born 1936) (1936–2016), Scottish footballer who emigrated to South Africa
Matt Gray (politician) (born c. 1980), American politician, member of the Colorado House of Representatives
Matt Gray (footballer, born 1981), English footballer and football manager for Sutton United
Matt Gray, songwriter on All I Wanna Do (Dannii Minogue song) and many other songs

See also
 Matthew Gray (disambiguation)